Mihael Onișa (born 15 March 2000) is a Romanian professional footballer who plays as a midfielder for Italian  club Piacenza on loan from Pordenone.

Career
After scoring twice to helping the Romania under-15 national team beat Italy, Onișa gained the attention of Red Bull Salzburg in Austria, Borussia Dortmund in Germany, English sides Liverpool and Everton, as well as Italian clubs Atalanta and Inter Milan.

In 2018, he signed for Torino in the Italian Serie A from Italian Serie B outfit Virtus Entella and played for their Under-19 squad for the next two seasons. He was first called up to Torino's senior squad in July 2020 for two Serie A games, but remained on the bench.

On 1 September 2020, Onișa was sent on loan to Cavese in the Italian third-tier Serie C.

On 1 February 2021, he was loaned to another Serie C squad Imolese.

On 6 July 2021, he signed a three-year contract with Serie B squad Pordenone. On 19 August 2022, Onișa was loaned by Piacenza with an option to buy.

References

External links
 

2000 births
Living people
Sportspeople from Timișoara
Romanian footballers
Association football wingers
Association football midfielders
Romania youth international footballers
Torino F.C. players
Cavese 1919 players
Imolese Calcio 1919 players
Serie C players
Pordenone Calcio players
Serie B players
Piacenza Calcio 1919 players
Romanian expatriate footballers
Romanian expatriate sportspeople in Italy
Expatriate footballers in Italy